The 2017 season is Sarpsborg 08's 6th season in Tippeligaen, following their return to the top level in 2012. It is also their third season with Geir Bakke as the club's manager.

Squad

Out on loan

Transfers

Winter

In:

Out:

Summer

In:

Out:

Competitions

Eliteserien

Results summary

Results by round

Results

Table

Norwegian Cup

Final

Squad statistics

Appearances and goals

|-
|colspan="14"|Players away from Sarpsborg 08 on loan:
|-
|colspan="14"|Players who left Sarpsborg 08 during the season:

|}

Goal scorers

Disciplinary record

References

Sarpsborg 08 FF seasons
Sarpsborg 08